Aladin Isaković (born 28 July 1985) is a Bosnian professional footballer who plays as a centre-back for First League of FBiH club Vis Simm-Bau.

Club career

Early career
Isaković started off his career at Žepče, where he played until 2009. After Žepče, he played for hometown club Čelik Zenica, Heimstetten, Travnik, Vitez and Frauenfeld.

Mladost Doboj Kakanj
On 24 December 2014, Isaković signed a contract with, at that time, First League of FBiH club Mladost Doboj Kakanj. In June 2015 with Mladost, he won the 2014–15 First League of FBiH and got promoted to the Bosnian Premier League. In 2017, Isaković became the captain of Mladost. On 30 June 2018, he extended his contract with the club until June 2020.

On 15 August 2018, in a 0–1 loss against Široki Brijeg, Isaković made his 100th appearance for Mladost, a club record. On 22 May 2019, he was named the Mladost Doboj Kakanj player of the 2018–19 season by the club supporters.

On 18 June 2020, Isaković left Mladost over five years after joining the club, with his contract expiring.

VIS Simm-Bau
On 3 July 2020, Isaković signed a contract with newly promoted First League of FBiH club Vis Simm-Bau. He made his official debut for Vis Simm-Bau on 8 August 2020 in a league win against Budućnost Banovići. Isaković scored his first goal for the club in a league match against Slaven Živinice on 22 August 2020.

Career statistics

Club

Honours
Mladost Doboj Kakanj
First League of FBiH: 2014–15

Individual
Awards
Mladost Doboj Kakanj Player of the Season by supporters: 2018–19

References

External links
Aladin Isaković at Sofascore

1985 births
Living people
Sportspeople from Zenica
Association football central defenders
Bosnia and Herzegovina footballers
NK Žepče players
NK Čelik Zenica players
SV Heimstetten players
NK Travnik players
NK Vitez players
FC Frauenfeld players
FK Mladost Doboj Kakanj players
NK Vis Simm-Bau players
Premier League of Bosnia and Herzegovina players
First League of the Federation of Bosnia and Herzegovina players
Landesliga players
2. Liga Interregional players
Bosnia and Herzegovina expatriate footballers
Expatriate footballers in Germany
Bosnia and Herzegovina expatriate sportspeople in Germany
Expatriate footballers in Switzerland
Bosnia and Herzegovina expatriate sportspeople in Switzerland